The University of Taubaté (in Portuguese; Universidade de Taubaté; UNITAU) is a municipal (partial city control) university located in the city of Taubaté, São Paulo state, Brazil. The institution is the largest and most traditional higher education college in the Paraíba Valley, State de São Paulo. It was established in 1973, gathering other pre-existing institutions and unifying them.

Nowadays, the university offers 42 undergraduate degrees, and 10 graduate programs, enrolling about 15,000 students.

References

External links
Official website (in Portuguese)
Official website (in English)

Universities and colleges in São Paulo (state)
Educational institutions established in 1956
1956 establishments in Brazil
State universities in Brazil